State Route 749 (SR 749) is an east–west state highway in the southwestern portion of the U.S. state of Ohio. Its western terminus is at a signalized intersection with US 52 in the hamlet of New Palestine, and its eastern terminus is at another signalized intersection, this time SR 132, in the unincorporated community of Lindale.

Route description
The entirety of SR 749 is nestled within the confines of Clermont County.  This state highway is not included as a part of the National Highway System.

History
SR 749 was first designated in 1937 along the routing that it currently occupies in southwestern Clermont County.  The highway has not experienced any major changes to its routing since its debut.

Major intersections

References

749
Transportation in Clermont County, Ohio